The South Line is a government-owned railway line in Denmark. Technically, the line connects Ringsted with Nykøbing Falster, from which it branches to Gedser and Rødbyhavn. In practice, Ringsted is not the terminal station, so the line is often said to continue to Copenhagen.

The railway is part of the Vogelfluglinie from Copenhagen to Hamburg. On Sydbanen's southwestern end at Rødby, a Scandlines ferry line exists to the German coastal town of Puttgarden, from where the Lübeck–Puttgarden railway and Lübeck–Hamburg railway lead to Hamburg. The Fehmarn Belt Tunnel, to be completed in 2028, will replace the ferry service. From 2020 until 2028 trains go only to Nykøbing, with frequent closures due to rebuilding.

The line is being upgraded to ERTMS, (Køge-)Næstved-Nykøbing in 2021, and the rest in 2028. Furthermore, 55 km of new tracks are being laid, to smooth out curves, allowing for 200 km/h when done. These works are expected to finish in 2021. Afterwards, the line will be electrified, slated for completion in 2024, when a new Storstrøm Bridge will also open. The railway Nykøbing–Rødby will be in operation only when the Fehmarn Tunnel is opened around 2028.

References

Railway lines in Denmark
Rail transport in Region Zealand